Seda Sulang, is a 1955 Sri Lankan romantic musical film directed and produced by Thambiraja Somasekaran for Ceylon Films Limited. The film starring Florida Jayalath and Prem Jayanth in lead roles whereas Dommie Jayawardena and David Dharmakeerthi made supportive roles.

Cast 
 Florida Jayalath as Seetha
 Prem Jayanth as Sunil
 Dommie Jayawardena as Eddie
 David Dharmakeerthi as Sir Edward Palipana
 Rosalyn Fernando as Mrs. Palipana
 Sujatha Paramanathan as Eddie's wife
 Lilian Edirisinghe
 Piyadasa Gunasekera as Anton
 Richard Albert as Rodaya
 Sunil Premadasa as Rasthiyadu
 Mohideen Baig as Beggar
 Dharma Sri Ranatunga as Edward
 Shanti Abeysekara as Dancing teacher
 Daya Abeysekara as Young Sunil
 Padmini Dahanayake as Young Seetha
 Bimba Kumari as Leela
 T. Somasekaran
 M. P. Gilman

Production 
The film was filmed at the Vahini Studio in Madras, where Somasekaran included several scenes from Sri Lanka such as the Temple of the Tooth in Kandy, the Parliament in Colombo, Independence Memorial Hall and the Kadugannawa Binge. They were captured on camera by Indian cameraman Raj Gopal. It is also the first and only Sinhala film where a song was sung by Indian songstress Latha Mangeshkar.

The film premiered in Ceylon Theaters on June 24, 1955. It has been screened for 23 months and 2 months at the Elphinston Cinema Hall in Maradana alone. Until then, advertisements were most widely used in Sinhala cinema in this film. In addition, a calendar with a color photo of Florida sells for free for 50 cents and a postcard size photo for 25 cents. On May 5, 1955, the Mayor of Colombo, Dr. N. M. Perera, distributed prizes at Galle Face Green at 9 am at the 'Sada Sulang' Bicycle Competition. The film was screened again on 17 December 1977 with 7 copies.

In violation of the agreement and played its aristocratic statue in the film by Dommie Jayawardena, Somasekaran took action against him to lodge a complaint in the Madras court. It was alleging that Dommie acted in the film Radala Piliruwa by breaking the agreement with Film Ceylon and had not come to work on the film without any notice since September 10, 1954, and that he had contracted with Cinemas Ltd. However, Somasekaran's complaint was dismissed subject to legal fees.

Soundtrack 
The film recorded 17 songs, which is by far the highest number of songs consisted in a Sinhala film.

References 

1955 films
Films scored by Susarla Dakshinamurthi
Sinhala-language films
Sri Lankan romance films
1950s romantic musical films
Sri Lankan musical films
Sri Lankan black-and-white films